Fritz Axel Albert Lindqvist (26 February 1888 – 28 March 1961) was a Swedish tennis player. He competed in singles and mixed doubles at the 1920 Summer Olympics and finished 14th–32nd.

References

External links
 
 
 

1888 births
1961 deaths
Swedish male tennis players
Olympic tennis players of Sweden
Tennis players at the 1920 Summer Olympics
Sportspeople from Lund